East Infection is currently the only EP by Gogol Bordello, released in 2005 by Rubric Records. Released prior to the album Gypsy Punks, it consists of leftover tracks from that album's sessions.

The title track remains a live favourite. "Ave. B" was rerecorded as "Avenue B" for Gypsy Punks, and "Strange Uncles From Abroad" was rerecorded as "My Strange Uncles From Abroad" for Super Taranta! "Copycat" is also notable for being the band's first song in the dub style. "Mala Vida" is a cover of a song by Mano Negra, and "Madagascar-Roumania" incorporates a traditional Boyash folk song, "Tu Jésty Fáta" (standard Romanian: "Tu Esti Fata").

Track listing
All songs by Eugene Hütz. All music by Eugene Hütz and Gogol Bordello, except "Mala Vida" (Mano Negra) and "Tu Jésty Fáta" (Romanian folk song).

Enhanced Element:
"Never Young Again" - Video by Dimon.

Personnel
Eugene Hutz – Vocals, Acoustic Guitar, Drums on Track 4
Sergey Ryabtsev – Violin, Backing Vocals
Yuri Lemeshev – Accordion, Backing Vocals
Oren Kaplan – Guitar, Backing Vocals
Rea Mochiach – Bass
Eliot Ferguson – Drums
Pamela Jintana Racine – Percussion
Elizabeth Sun – Percussion

Additional musicians
Andra Ursuta – Vocals on track 1 and 6
Pedro Erazo – Backing Vocals on track 3
Ori Kaplan – Saxophone on track 5

2005 debut EPs
Gogol Bordello albums
Rubric Records EPs
albums produced by Steve Albini